Lawson Heights can refer to:
 Lawson Heights, Pennsylvania
Lawson Heights Suburban Centre, Saskatoon, Saskatchewan
Lawson Heights, Saskatoon